John Aloysius Brett (1879–1955) was an administrator in British India. He served as Chief Commissioner of Baluchistan during the 1930s.

Brett was commissioned as a Second lieutenant in the Royal Garrison Artillery on 26 May 1900, and was promoted to the rank of Lieutenant on 7 March 1902. He transferred to the Indian Staff Corps later the same year.

References

Chief Commissioners of Baluchistan
1955 deaths
1879 births
Royal Garrison Artillery officers
British people in colonial India